Paddy Hayes (born 1921) was an Irish hurler who played as a right left corner-back for the Cork senior team.

Hayes joined the team during the 1941 championship and made some cameo appearances as a substitute until his retirement after the 1944 championship. During that time he won one Munster medal on the field of play. Hayes also won two All-Ireland medals as a non-playing substitute.

At club level Hayes played with Blackrock.

Playing career

Club

Hayes played his club hurling with Blackrock, however, his career coincided with a downturn in the club's fortunes. He ended his career without a championship medal.

Inter-county

Hayes first came to prominence on the inter-county scene as a member of the Cork minor hurling team in 1939. He won a Munster medal that year following an 8–3 to 0-2 trouncing of Clare. The subsequent All-Ireland decider pitted Cork against Kilkenny. A 5–2 to 2–2 score line gave Hayes an All-Ireland Minor Hurling Championship medal.

Two years later in 1941 Hayes joined the Cork senior hurling team. He was an unused substitute throughout the entire championship campaign, however, he collected an All-Ireland medal as he was a member of the extended panel for Cork's All-Ireland final defeat of Dublin.

After being dropped from the panel the following year, Hayes returned to the Cork senior set-up in 1943. He made his championship debut when he came on as a substitute in a 2–13 to 3-8 provincial decider defeat of Waterford. It was his first Munster medal. Hayes later collected a second All-Ireland medal as an unused sub.

In 1944 Hayes broke onto the Cork starting fifteen. He lined out in the opening two games of the championship, however, he was dropped for the Munster final replay victory over Limerick. This brought Hayes's inter-county career to an end.

References

1921 births
Blackrock National Hurling Club hurlers
Cork inter-county hurlers
Possibly living people